Metel Anti-Ship Complex ( 'Snowstorm'; NATO reporting name: SS-N-14 Silex) is a Russian family of anti-submarine missiles. There are different anti-submarine variants ('Metel') for cruisers and frigates, and a later version with a shaped charge ('Rastrub') that can be used against shipping as well as submarines.

The missile carries an underslung anti-submarine torpedo which it drops immediately above the suspected position of a submarine. The torpedo then proceeds to search and then home in on the submarine. In the case of the 85RU/URPK-5, the UGMT-1 torpedo is a multi-purpose torpedo and can be used against submarines as well as surface ships.  The missile has been in operational service since 1968, but is no longer in production; it was superseded by the RPK-2 Viyuga (SS-N-15 'Starfish').

Development
However this meant that a ship would still be in range of the submarine's torpedoes and missiles, and depth charges were less accurate than homing torpedoes. In 1963 the US Navy introduced ASROC, a missile that flew to the estimated position of the target submarine, and then dropped a torpedo into the water to destroy it. The SS-N-14 was the Soviet response.

Design
The missile is based on the P-120 Malakhit (NATO: SS-N-9 'Siren') anti-shipping missile. The missile itself is radio command guided and is powered by a solid fuel rocket motor. The later 'Rastrub' models of the weapon were "universal" carrying a UGMT-1 multi-purpose torpedo and in addition had  shaped charge warhead for use against ships guided by radio command and infrared seeker. In anti-submarine mode the missile flew at approximately  altitude, and when it was over the estimated position of the target submarine the missile was commanded to release the torpedo or depth charge.

Operational history
The URPK-4 was introduced in 1973, and the anti-ship version URPK-5 Rastrub in 1976. The URPK-4 has been used With the first batch of the s; the Udaloy II carries the SS-N-15 'Starfish'. The system was installed on the battlecruiser Admiral Ushakov (ex-Kirov) but not on her sister ships.

Of these the Krestas and Karas have been retired, along with most of the Burevestniks and half the Udaloys; the Kirov appears to have been upgraded to the SS-N-16 'Stallion' at some point. 100 missiles are estimated to remain in service .

Variants

 60R - Original version armed with 5 kt nuclear depth charge
 70R - Original version armed with AT-2U ASW torpedo
 83R/URPK-3 Metel - Cruiser version of the missile using the guidance system from the SA-N-3 missile and the KT-106 launcher. Uses AT-1 torpedo (EA-45-70A)
 84R/URPK-4 Metel-U, KT-106U launcher, used on Udaloy-class destroyers. Entered service 1973. Uses AT-2 (AT-2UM) torpedo (E53-72), which has either 100 kg HE warhead or possibly a 5 kt nuclear warhead.
 85RU/URPK-5 Rastrub, KT-100U launcher. Entered service 1975. Carries UGMT-1 (AT-3 Orlan) anti- sub and anti-ship torpedo and is in addition anti-shipping missile with a warhead of 185 kg.
 85RUS/URPK-5 Nuclear tipped version of the missile.
 YP-85 Proposed long-range version - see above.

Operators

Gallery

Notes and references

 Naval Institute Guide to World Naval Weapon Systems 1997 to 1998
 ''Jane's Underwater Warfare Systems 2006-2007

External links
 Images of the missiles in the launch tubes at wonderland.org.nz
 Page about the SS-N-14 in Russian
 Manufacturer's page about the URK-5

Anti-submarine missiles
Submarine-launched cruise missiles of Russia
Cold War submarine-launched cruise missiles of the Soviet Union
Naval weapons of Russia
Guided missiles of the Soviet Union
Nuclear weapons
Military equipment introduced in the 1960s